The 2013 Big South Conference baseball tournament was held from May 21 through 25.  The top eight regular season finishers of the conference's twelve teams met in the double-elimination tournament, which was held at Liberty Baseball Stadium on the campus of Liberty University in Lynchburg, Virginia.  In the championship game, fifth-seeded Liberty defeated first-seeded Campbell, 2-1, to win its fourth tournament championship.  As a result, Liberty earned the conference's automatic bid to the 2013 NCAA Division I baseball tournament.

Seeding and format
With the introduction of division play in 2013, the division winners were seeded one and two, and the next six finishers from the regular season, regardless of division, were seeded three through eight based on conference winning percentage only.  The teams played a two bracket, double-elimination tournament, with the winners of each bracket facing off in a single elimination final.

Results

All-Tournament Team
The following players were named to the All-Tournament Team.

Most Valuable Player
Liberty outfielder/pitcher Ashton Perritt was named the tournament's Most Valuable Player.

References

Big South Conference Baseball Tournament
Tournament
Big South Conference baseball tournament
Big South Conference baseball tournament
Baseball in Virginia
College sports in Virginia
Sports in Lynchburg, Virginia